The Uruguayan National Time Trial Championships is a cycling race where the Uruguayan cyclists decide who will become the champion for the year to come.

Men

Elite

U23

Junior

Women

Elite

Under 23

See also
Uruguayan National Road Race Championships
National Road Cycling Championships

References

National road cycling championships
Cycle races in Uruguay